Pasiphilodes testulata, the pome looper, is a moth of the family Geometridae. The species was first described by Achille Guenée in 1857. It is found in Tasmania and on Norfolk Island, as well as in New Zealand and on the Chatham Islands and Kermadec Islands.

Subspecies
Pasiphilodes testulata testulata
Pasiphilodes testulata nobbsi (Holloway, 1977)

References

Moths described in 1857
Eupitheciini
Moths of New Zealand
Moths of Australia
Arthropods of Tasmania
Fauna of Norfolk Island